Oberndorf is a municipality in Kitzbühel district in the Austrian state of Tyrol. It is located in the Leukental valley, on the Kitzbühler Ache stream, halfway between St. Johann in Tirol and Kitzbühel.

The municipality consists of a main village and several hamlets, reaching up to the Kitzbühler Horn mountain. Its neighbouring municipalities are Going am Wilden Kaiser, Kitzbühel, Reith bei Kitzbühel, and St. Johann in Tirol.

Population

Economy
Until the 18th century copper was mined at the Rerobichl.

Today, economy is focused on tourism, and a quarry. Oberndorf has a railway halt on the Salzburg-Tyrol Railway.

Panorama

References

External links 

 Oberndorf Gigapixel Panorama (7.000 Megapixel)

Kitzbühel Alps
Cities and towns in Kitzbühel District